Clarence Bowden Wyatt (October 4, 1917 – January 21, 1969) was an American football player and coach.  Wyatt played college football at the University of Tennessee and was later the head football coach at three schools, the University of Wyoming (1947–1952), the University of Arkansas (1953–1954), and his alma mater, Tennessee (1955–1962).  He compiled a 99–56–5 record in 16 seasons as a head coach.

In Wyoming, Wyatt turned around a team that had struggled under previous coach Bunny Oakes and had operated intermittently in the previous years because of World War II. His turnaround plan involved a round-the-clock training regimen, one that defensive back Marv Levy would later note did not allow players adequate time to complete their academic studies (leading Levy to transfer to Coe College). Wyatt's plan would secure Wyoming a perfect season and a win in the 1951 Gator Bowl.

Wyatt's most notable victory at Tennessee came on November 7, 1959, when his Tennessee Volunteers football Volunteers upset top-ranked LSU, 14–13, by stopping a two-point conversion attempt by eventual Heisman Trophy winner Billy Cannon late in the game.  The victory ended the Tigers' 18-game winning streak.

Wyatt was elected to the College Football Hall of Fame in 1972 as a player and again in 1997 as a coach.

Personal life and death
Wyatt married Mary Alson Miller around 1940. They had one daughter named Mary Gail "Missy", born in 1942.

Wyatt died of viral pneumonia on January 21, 1969, at hospital in Sweetwater, Tennessee.

Head coaching record

References

External links
 
 
 

1917 births
1969 deaths
American football ends
Arkansas Razorbacks football coaches
Del Monte Pre-Flight Navyators football players
Mississippi State Bulldogs football coaches
Oklahoma State Cowboys football coaches
Tennessee Volunteers and Lady Volunteers athletic directors
Tennessee Volunteers football coaches
Tennessee Volunteers football players
Wyoming Cowboys football coaches
All-American college football players
College Football Hall of Fame inductees
People from Kingston, Tennessee
Coaches of American football from Tennessee
Players of American football from Tennessee
Deaths from pneumonia in Tennessee